Lauren W. Whittington is an American journalist who serves as politics editor for Roll Call newspaper. She was promoted to that position in 2009; prior to that, she worked as a political reporter at the same publication.

Career
In 2005, Whittington was named one of "Pennsylvania's Most Influential Reporters" by the Pennsylvania political news website PoliticsPA. She has appeared as a guest on C-SPAN "Newsmakers" program.

References

External links

Living people
Year of birth missing (living people)
Journalists from Pennsylvania
Pennsylvania political journalists
American newspaper reporters and correspondents
Place of birth missing (living people)